Major-General Charles Camac Luard, CB, CMG (14 September 1867 – 28 June 1947) was Commander of British Troops in South China.

Military career
Fourth in a line of British army officers, and born the son of Richard Luard and educated at Clifton College, Luard was commissioned as a lieutenant in the Durham Light Infantry on 2 September 1885. He served as an Assistant Superintendent of Army Signalling in the Zhob Field Force in 1890, and was promoted captain on 13 February 1895.

In late December 1901 he was placed in command of the Burma Mounted Infantry serving in the Second Boer War in South Africa, with the local rank of major whilst in command. He was mentioned in despatches (dated 8 April 1902) and received a brevet promotion as major in the South African Honours list published on 26 June 1902.

He later served in World War I commanding a Brigade in India followed by 9th Infantry Brigade and was then deployed as part of the Mesopotamian Expeditionary Force and then the Egyptian Expeditionary Force.

After the war he again became a Brigade Commander in India and moved on to be Commander of British Troops in South China in 1925: he retired in 1929.

Luard Road (盧押道) in Wan Chai on Hong Kong Island was named after him.

Cricket
He was a keen cricketer and played for the Europeans cricket team and Bombay in India, playing four first-class matches in the 1892/3 and 1898/9 seasons.

References

1867 births
1947 deaths
People educated at Clifton College
Durham Light Infantry officers
British Army generals of World War I
Companions of the Order of the Bath
British Army major generals
Military personnel from Sussex
Companions of the Order of St Michael and St George
English cricketers
Europeans cricketers
Mumbai cricketers
British Army personnel of the Second Boer War
People from Herstmonceux